"Lifted" is a song recorded by Canadian country music artist Dallas Smith for his second studio album of the same name (2014). The ballad about young love was written by Jeremy Stover, Jaren Johnston, and Zac Maloy, and is Smith's favourite song on the record. It was released to Canadian country radio on February 17, 2015 as the second single off the album, or fifth including the singles from Tippin' Point (2014).

Chart performance
"Lifted" debuted at number thirty-nine on the Billboard Canada Country airplay chart for the chart dated March 7, 2015 – the highest debut of the week.

Music video
The video for "Lifted" was directed by Nigel Dick and premiered March 9, 2015 on CMT Canada.

Charts

Certifications

References

2014 songs
2015 singles
Dallas Smith songs
604 Records singles
Republic Nashville singles
Songs written by Jeremy Stover
Songs written by Jaren Johnston
Songs written by Zac Maloy
Song recordings produced by Joey Moi
Songs about nostalgia
Music videos directed by Nigel Dick